The Hot Spring County Courthouse is located at 210 Locust Street in Malvern, the county seat of Hot Spring County, Arkansas.  It is a -story frame structure, its exterior clad in brick.  It is an H-shaped structure, with slightly projecting end wings and a central connecting section, where the main entrance is located.  The bays of the central section are articulated by brick pilasters, with the building otherwise exhibiting a restrained Art Deco styling.  The building was designed by Arkansas architect Charles L. Thompson, and was built in 1936.  It is the only significant example of Art Deco architecture in the county.

The building was listed on the National Register of Historic Places in 1996.

See also
National Register of Historic Places listings in Hot Spring County, Arkansas

References

Courthouses on the National Register of Historic Places in Arkansas
Art Deco architecture in Arkansas
Government buildings completed in 1936
Buildings and structures in Malvern, Arkansas
National Register of Historic Places in Hot Spring County, Arkansas
Hot Spring
1936 establishments in Arkansas